Public Execution is a Mouse and the Traps retrospective album that has been released in both LP and CD formats.  The LP has an unusually large number of tracks (19), while the CD includes 4 bonus tracks and catalogues almost all of the released music by Mouse and the Traps and their associated bands:  Mouse, Positively 13 O'Clock and Chris St. John.

Release data

This album was released as an LP by Eva Records (a French record label) in 1982 as #EV-12001.  It was reissued in 1995 as a CD by New Rose Blues Records as #4015.

Track listing 

All tracks credited to Mouse and the Traps unless otherwise noted

LP

Side 1
 A Public Execution (Knox Henderson/Ronnie Weiss), 2:43; by Mouse
 All for You (Knox Henderson/Ronnie Weiss), 2:39; by Mouse
 Maid of Sugar, Maid of Spice (Knox Henderson/Ronnie Weiss), 2:35
 I'm the One (Knox Henderson/Ronnie Weiss), 2:20
 Would You Believe (Levy/Fullman), 2:34
 Like I Know You Do (Knox Henderson/Ronnie Weiss), 2:21
 Do the Best You Can (Robin Brians), 2:24
 Promises Promises (Robin Brians/Payne), 2:24
 Psychotic Reaction (Kenn Ellner, Roy Chaney, Craig "Butch" Atkinson, John "Sean" Byrne, John "Mouse" Michalski), 2:00; by Positively 13 O'Clock

Side 2
 Cryin' Inside (David Stanley/Ronnie Weiss), 2:32
 Ya-Ya (Dorsey/Lewis/Robinson), 1:54
 Beg Borrow and Steal (Ronnie Weiss), 2:32
 L.O.V.E. Love (David Stanley/Ronnie Weiss), 2:24
 Sometimes You Just Can't Win (Robin Brians/Knox Henderson), 2:50
 Look at the Sun (Gillespie), 2:38
 Requiem for Sarah (David Stanley), 3:17
 Wicker Wine (Ronnie Weiss/David Stanley), 2:35
 I Believe Her (Ronnie Weiss/David Stanley), 2:55
 13 O'Clock Theme for Psychotics (Maynard/Payne), 1:36; by Positively 13 O'Clock

CD

Bonus tracks only; the tracks on the LP are listed in the same order on the CD

 I Satisfy (David Stanley/Ronnie Weiss), 3:45
 Good Times (David Stanley/Ronnie Weiss), 2:32
 I've Got Her Love (Robin Brians/Mack Barton), 2:17; by Chris St. John
 As Far as the Sea (Robin Brians/Mack Barton), 2:39; by Chris St. John

Mouse and the Traps albums
Public Execution (LP)